Semolina is coarsely milled durum wheat mainly used in making couscous, pasta, and sweet puddings. The term semolina is also used to designate coarse millings of other varieties of wheat, and sometimes other grains (such as rice or corn) as well.

Etymology
Semolina is derived from the Italian word , 1790–1800; alteration of Italian , equivalent to semol(a) "bran" + -ino diminutive suffix. The words simila, semidalis, groat, and grain may all have similar proto-Indo-European origins as two Sanskrit terms for wheat, samita and godhuma, or may be loan words from the Semitic root smd "to grind into groats" (cf.  ).

Production

Modern milling of wheat into flour is a process that employs grooved steel rollers. The rollers are adjusted so that the space between them is slightly narrower than the width of the wheat kernels. As the wheat is fed into the mill, the rollers flake off the bran and germ while the starch (or endosperm) is cracked into coarse pieces in the process. Through sifting, these endosperm particles, the semolina, are separated from the bran. The semolina is then ground into flour. This greatly simplifies the process of separating the endosperm from the bran and germ, as well as making it possible to separate the endosperm into different grades because the inner part of the endosperm tends to break down into smaller pieces than the outer part. Different grades of flour can thus be produced.

Types
Semolina made from hard durum wheat (Triticum turgidum subsp. durum) is pale yellow in color. It may be milled either coarse or fine, and both are used in a wide variety of sweet and savory dishes, including many types of pasta. Common names in other languages include:

 Italian: semola di grano duro; coarse (no descriptor), fine rimacinata
 Greek: simigdáli σιμιγδάλι; coarse chondró χονδρό, fine psiló ψιλό
 Arabic: samīd سميد; coarse ḵašin خشن, fine nāʿim ناعم
 Turkish: irmik; coarse iri, fine ince
 Hindustani: baṃsī ravā, bansi rava बंसी रवा (milled only coarse, not fine)

Semolina made from common wheat (Triticum aestivum) is beige in color. In the United States, it is called farina (not to be confused with Italian farina, which is common-wheat flour), and it is used more often for desserts than for savory foods. In the Indian subcontinent, common-wheat semolina may be milled either coarse or fine, and both are used in a wide variety of both sweet and savory dishes. Common names in other languages include:

 Punjabi: sūjī ਸੂਜੀ
 Nepali: sūjī सूजी
 Hindustani: sūjī सूजी/سوجی, or ravā रवा; coarse moṭī मोटी, fine bārīk बारीक
 Bangla: sūjī সুজি
 Dhivehi: ravā ރަވާ
 Gujarati: sōjī સોજી
 Marathi: ravā रवा
 Telugu: ravva రవ్వ 
 Kannada: rave ರವೆ
 Tamil: ravai ரவை
 Malayalam: ṟava റവ

Broadly speaking, meal produced from grains other than wheat may also be referred to as semolina, e.g., rice semolina and corn semolina. Corn semolina is commonly called grits in the United States.

Dishes

Savory
In Germany, Austria, Hungary, Bosnia-Herzegovina, Bulgaria, Serbia, Slovenia, Romania, Slovakia and Croatia, (durum) semolina is known as (Hartweizen-)Grieß (a word related to "grits") and is mixed with egg to make Grießknödel, which can be added to soup. The particles are fairly coarse, between 0.25 and 0.75 millimeters in diameter. It is also cooked in milk and sprinkled with chocolate to be eaten as breakfast.

In Italy, (durum) semolina is used to make a type of soup by directly boiling fine semolina in vegetable or chicken broth. Semolina can also be used for making a type of gnocchi called Gnocchi alla Romana, where semolina is mixed with milk, cheese and butter to form a log, then cut in discs and baked with cheese and bechamel.

Semolina is a common food in West Africa, especially among Nigerians. It is eaten as either lunch or dinner with stew or soup. It is prepared just like eba (cassava flour) or fufu with water and boiled for 5 to 10 minutes.

In much of North Africa, durum semolina is made into the staple couscous and different kinds of flat breads like m'semen, kesra, khobz and other.

In Pakistan and North India semolina is called sooji, and in South India, rava. Semolina is used to make savory South Indian foods, such as rava dosa, rava idli, rava kitchadi and upma. It is used to coat slices of fish before it is pan-fried in oil. Rotis can also be made from semolina.

Sweet
In the US, semolina (specifically farina) is boiled to produce a porridge; a popular brand of this is Cream of Wheat.

In the UK, the flour is mixed with hot milk, sugar and vanilla to make a warm pudding dessert. It has fallen out of favour in the last 30 years due to the slight coarseness that the grains retain. Prior to 1970 it was a staple pudding served in school lunches.

In e.g. A dollop of butter is also often added. This dish is called Grießkoch in Austria,  in Germany, and semolina pudding in English.  or Grießkoch can also be mixed with whipped egg whites and sometimes fruits or nuts and baked in the oven, and is then called .

A baked dish containing semolina called migliaccio is present in the Neapolitan tradition in Italy; it is a mixture of ricotta, vanilla and citrus peel, similar to the filling in sfogliatelle, with added semolina flour to obtain a simple, firm cake.

In Slovakia, Sweden, Estonia, Finland, Lithuania, Latvia, Poland, Romania, Ukraine, Belarus, Israel, and Russia, it is eaten as a breakfast porridge, sometimes mixed with raisins and served with milk.

In the Middle East and North Africa, basbousa (also called harisa in some varieties of Arabic, e.g. Alexandrian dialect of Egyptian Arabic) is a sweet semolina cake soaked in fragrant syrup and frequently topped with nuts. In North Africa, it is also used to make harcha, a kind of griddle cake often eaten for breakfast, commonly with jam or honey.Baghrir is popular North African pancake made with semolina or flour that is served for breakfast.

In Indian sub continent, semolina (called Rava, suji or shuji) is used for such sweets as halwa and rava kesari. Such a preparation is also a popular dessert in Greece (halvas) and Cyprus (halvas). In Greece, the dessert galaktoboureko is made by making a custard from the semolina and then wrapping it in phyllo sheets. In Cyprus, the semolina may be mixed also with almond cordial to create a light, water-based pudding. In Turkey (helva), Bulgaria (halva), Iran (halva), Pakistan (halva), Bangladesh (halua), Palestine (khalva), and Arab countries, halawa is sometimes made with semolina scorched with sugar, butter, milk, and pine nuts. In Nepal, semolina is called suji and is used for preparing sweet dishes such as haluwa (Nepali equivalent of Indian and Pakistani halwa) or puwa. In Myanmar (Burma), semolina (called shwegyi) is used in a popular dessert called sanwin makin. In Sri Lanka semolina is called rulan and used to make creamy porridge and a sweet confectionery called "rulan aluwa". In Turkey sweet dishes called şekerpare and şambali are made with semolina.

In baking
As an alternative to corn meal, semolina can be used to flour the baking surface to prevent sticking. In bread making, a small proportion of durum semolina added to the usual mix of flour is said to produce a tasty crust.

See also
 Guriev porridge
Bombay rava

References

External links

Breakfast cereals
Cereals
Wheat
Algerian cuisine
Arab cuisine
Egyptian cuisine
Greek cuisine
Iraqi cuisine
Israeli cuisine
Jordanian cuisine
Lebanese cuisine
Levantine cuisine
Libyan cuisine
Moroccan cuisine
Pakistani cuisine
Palestinian cuisine
Syrian cuisine
Tunisian cuisine
Ukrainian cuisine